Kirkland is a planned Réseau express métropolitain (REM) station in the city of Kirkland, Quebec, Canada. It is planned to be operated by CDPQ Infra and to serve as a station of the Anse-à-l'Orme branch of the REM. It is scheduled to open in the second quarter of 2024.

References

Railway stations in Montreal
Réseau express métropolitain railway stations
Kirkland, Quebec
Railway stations scheduled to open in 2024